Eaux-Puiseaux is a commune in the Aube department in north-central France.

Eaux-Puiseaux is situated about 35 km from Troyes and 50 km from Auxerre, in the canton of Aix-Villemaur-Pâlis. The RN77 road passes close to the village.

Population

See also
Communes of the Aube department

References

Communes of Aube